A recursive acronym is an acronym that refers to itself, and appears most frequently in computer programming. The term was first used in print in 1979 in Douglas Hofstadter's book Gödel, Escher, Bach: An Eternal Golden Braid, in which Hofstadter invents the acronym GOD, meaning "GOD Over Djinn", to help explain infinite series, and describes it as a recursive acronym. Other references followed, however the concept was used as early as 1968 in John Brunner's science fiction novel Stand on Zanzibar. In the story, the acronym EPT (Education for Particular Task) later morphed into "Eptification for Particular Task".

Recursive acronyms typically form backwardly: either an existing ordinary acronym is given a new explanation of what the letters stand for, or a name is turned into an acronym by giving the letters an explanation of what they stand for, in each case with the first letter standing recursively for the whole acronym.

Use in computing
In computing, an early tradition in the hacker community, especially at MIT, was to choose acronyms and abbreviations that referred humorously to themselves or to other abbreviations. Perhaps the earliest example in this context is the backronym "Mash Until No Good", which was created in 1960 to describe Mung, and revised to "Mung Until No Good". It lived on as a recursive command in the editing language TECO.[3] In 1977 programmer Ted Anderson coined TINT ("TINT Is Not TECO"), an editor for MagicSix. This inspired the two MIT Lisp Machine editors called EINE ("EINE Is Not Emacs", German for one) and ZWEI ("ZWEI Was EINE Initially", German for two), in turn inspiring Anderson's retort SINE ("SINE is not EINE"). Richard Stallman followed with GNU (GNU's Not Unix). 

Recursive acronym examples often include negatives, such as denials that the thing defined is or resembles something else (which the thing defined does in fact resemble or is even derived from), to indicate that, despite the similarities, it was distinct from the program on which it was based.

An earlier example appears in a 1976 textbook on data structures, in which the pseudo-language SPARKS is used to define the algorithms discussed in the text. "SPARKS" is claimed to be a non-acronymic name, but "several cute ideas have been suggested" as expansions of the name. One of the suggestions is "Smart Programmers Are Required to Know SPARKS". (this example is tail recursive)

Examples

 Allegro: Allegro Low LEvel Game ROutines (early versions for Atari ST were called "Atari Low Level Game Routines")
 AROS: AROS Research Operating System (originally Amiga Research Operating System)
 ATI: ATI Technologies Inc.
 BIRD: BIRD Internet Routing Daemon
 CAVE: CAVE Automatic Virtual Environment
 cURL: Curl URL Request Library
 Darcs: Darcs Advanced Revision Control System
 EINE: EINE Is Not Emacs
 FIJI: FIJI Is Just ImageJ
 GiNaC: GiNaC is Not a CAS (Computer Algebra System)
 GNU: GNU's Not Unix
 GPE: GPE Palmtop Environment
 gRPC: grpc Remote Procedure Calls
 HEEM: HEEM Everyone Even Myself
 LAME: LAME Ain't an MP3 Encoder
 LiVES: LiVES is a Video Editing System
 MINT: MINT Is Not TRAC
 MiNT: MiNT is Not TOS (later changed to "MiNT is Now TOS")
 Mung: Mung Until No Good
 Nano: Nano's Another editor
 Nagios: Nagios Ain't Gonna Insist On Sainthood (a reference to the previous name of Nagios, "Netsaint"; agios [αγιος] is the Greek word for "saint")
 NiL: NiL Isn't Liero
 Ninja-ide: Ninja-IDE Is Not Just Another IDE
 PHP: PHP: Hypertext Preprocessor (from "Personal Home Page Tools," more frequently referenced as "PHP Tools.")
 PINE: PINE Is Nearly Elm, originally; PINE now officially stands for "Pine Internet News and E-mail"
 PIP: PIP Installs Packages
 P.I.P.S.: P.I.P.S. Is POSIX on Symbian
 PNG: officially "Portable Network Graphics", but unofficially "PNG's not GIF".
 RPM: RPM Package Manager
 SPARQL: SPARQL Protocol And RDF Query Language
 TikZ: TikZ ist kein Zeichenprogramm (German; TikZ is not a drawing program)
 TiLP: TiLP is a Linking Program
 TIP: TIP isn't Pico
 TRESOR: TRESOR Runs Encryption Securely Outside RAM
 UIRA: UIRA Isn't a Recursive Acronym
 WINE: WINE Is Not an Emulator (Originally, Windows Emulator)
 XAMPP: XAMPP Apache MariaDB PHP Perl
 XINU: XINU Is Not Unix
 XNA: XNA's Not Acronymed
 YAML: YAML Ain't Markup Language (initially "Yet Another Markup Language")
 YARA: Yara: Another Recursive Acronym
 Zinf: Zinf Is Not FreeAmp
 ZWEI: ZWEI Was EINE Initially ("eins" and "zwei" are German for "one" and "two" respectively)

Other examples

Companies and organizations

 BWIA: BWIA West Indies Airways (formerly British West Indian Airways)
 Cygnus Solutions: "Cygnus, Your GNU Solutions"
 HIJOS: Hijos por la Identidad y la Justicia contra el Olvido y el Silencio
 HIM: HIM International Music, Taiwanese independent record label
 JACK: JACK Audio Connection Kit
 KGS: KGS Go Server
 MEGA: MEGA Encrypted Global Access
 MIATA: MIATA is Always the Answer
 MOM: MOM's Organic Market
 SAAB: Saab Automobile AB
 VISA: Visa International Service Association
 XBMC: XBMC Media Center (originally Xbox Media Center)
 ZINC: ZINC Is Not Commercial

In media
 TTP: a technology project in the Dilbert comic strip. The initials stand for "The TTP Project".
 GRUNGE: defined by Homer Simpson in The Simpsons episode That '90s Show as "Guitar Rock Utilizing Nihilist Grunge Energy", another uncommon example of a recursive acronym whose recursive letter is neither the first nor the last letter.
 BOB: the primary antagonist from the series Twin Peaks. His name itself is an acronym standing for "Beware of BOB".
 KOS-MOS: a character from the Xenosaga series of video games. "KOS-MOS" is a recursive acronym meaning "Kosmos Obey Strategical Multiple Operating Systems". 
 Hiroshi Yoshimura's "A・I・R" stands for "AIR IN RESORT".

Special
 The GNU Hurd project is named with a mutually recursive acronym: "Hurd" stands for "Hird of Unix-Replacing Daemons", and "Hird" stands for "Hurd of Interfaces Representing Depth."
 RPM, PHP, XBMC and YAML were originally conventional acronyms which were later redefined recursively. They are examples of, or may be referred to as, backronymization, where the official meaning of an acronym is changed.
 Jini claims the distinction of being the first recursive anti-acronym: 'Jini Is Not Initials'. It might, however, be more properly termed an anti-backronym because the term "Jini" never stood for anything in the first place. The more recent "XNA", on the other hand, was deliberately designed that way.
 Most recursive acronyms are recursive on the first letter, which is therefore an arbitrary choice, often selected for reasons of humour, ease of pronunciation, or consistency with an earlier acronym that used the same letters for different words, such as PHP, which now stands for "PHP: Hypertext Preprocessor", but was originally "Personal Home Page". However YOPY, "Your own personal YOPY" is recursive on the last letter.
 A joke implying that the middle initial "B." in the name of Benoit B. Mandelbrot stands for "Benoit B. Mandelbrot" plays on the idea that fractals, which Mandelbrot studied, repeat themselves at smaller and smaller scales when examined closely.

Other
 According to Hayyim Vital, a 16th–17th century kabbalist, the Hebrew word adam (אדם, meaning "man") is an acronym for adam, dibbur, maaseh (man, speech, deed).
 According to Isaac Luria, a 16th century kabbalist, the Hebrew word tzitzit (ציצת in its Biblical spelling, meaning "ritual fringes") is an acronym for tzaddik yafrid tzitziyotav tamid ("a righteous person should separate [the strings of] his tzitzit constantly").

See also
 
  (Redundant Acronym Syndrome syndrome)
 
 TLA, the three-letter acronym for three-letter acronyms
 , which intentionally uses the acronym "OWL"

References

External links
 

 Recursive
Recursion
Rhetoric
Self-reference
Types of words
Word play

it:Acronimo#Acronimo ricorsivo